Eutropis alcalai is a species of skink, a lizard in the family Scincidae. The species is endemic to the Philippines.

Etymology
The specific name, alcalai, is in honor of Filipino herpetologist Angel Chua Alcala.

Geographic range
E. alcalai is found in western Mindanao, the Philippines.

References

Further reading
Barley AJ, Sanguila MB, Brown RM (2021). "A new species of Sun Skink (Reptilia: Scincidae: Eutropis) from the Zamboanga Peninsula, southwestern Mindanao Island, Philippines". Philippine Journal of Systematic Biology 14 (2): 1–18. (Eutropis alcalai, new species).

Eutropis
Reptiles described in 2021
Reptiles of the Philippines
Endemic fauna of the Philippines